Cryptomeliola is a genus of fungi in the family Meliolaceae.

References

External links 
 Index Fungorum

Fungal plant pathogens and diseases
Sordariomycetes genera
Meliolaceae